Seenpur  is a village in Kapurthala district of Punjab State, India. The village is administrated by a Sarpanch, who is an elected representative.

Demography 
According to the report published by Census India in 2011, Seenpur has total number of 154 houses and population of 855 of which include 440 males and 415 females. Literacy rate of Seenpur is 71.92%, lower than state average of 75.84%.  The population of children under the age of 6 years is 93 which is 10.88% of total population of Seenpur, and child sex ratio is approximately 1325, higher than state average of 846.

Population data

Air travel connectivity 
The closest airport to the village is Sri Guru Ram Dass Jee International Airport.

Villages in Kapurthala

References

External links
  Villages in Kapurthala
 Kapurthala Villages List

Villages in Kapurthala district